KEUG (105.5 MHz) is a commercial FM radio station licensed to Veneta, Oregon, and serving the Eugene-Springfield metropolitan area.  It is owned by McKenzie River Broadcasting and airs an adult hits radio format known as 105.5 BOB FM.  The radio studios and offices are on Country Club Road in Eugene, co-located with sister stations 93.3 KKNU and 94.5 KMGE.

KEUG has an effective radiated power (ERP) of 2,800 watts.  Its transmitter is on Blanton Heights Road in Eugene, along with the towers for other area FM and TV stations.  It also broadcasts on a 250 watt FM translator, K277CT in Cottage Grove at 103.3 MHz.

History
The current owner, McKenzie River Broadcasting, acquired the station in 2004 for $1.02 million.

References

External links
KEUG official website

EUG
Adult hits radio stations in the United States
Bob FM stations
Radio stations established in 1982
1982 establishments in Oregon